Protecting the King is a 2007 American drama film starring Peter Dobson as Elvis Presley. Rereleased June 2022, the film may be rented for streaming at the official webpage of the film. 
It tells the story of David Stanley (Matt Barr), the stepbrother and bodyguard of Elvis.

In June 1972, The King Of Rock & Roll, Elvis Presley, invites his sixteen-year-old stepbrother David Stanley to drop out of school and join his personal entourage. David eagerly accepts and embarks on an eye-opening journey that’s every teenager's Rock & Roll fantasy. A boy in a man's world, David quickly becomes a bodyguard, caretaker, and fixer. He finds himself struggling to do whatever is necessary to shield the image of his beloved brother while dealing with the demons of his own personal life.

Cast
 Peter Dobson as Elvis Presley
 Matt Barr as David Stanley
 Tom Sizemore as Ronnie
 Dey Young as Dee
 Max Perlich as Daryl
 Mark Rolston as Frank
 John Bennett Perry as Vernon Presley
 Brian Krause as Jeff
 Katie A. Keane as Barbara
 Danielle Keaton as Katie
 Robert R. Shafer as Officer Gibbs
 Larry Tatum as Ed Parker

References

External links
 Official site

2007 films
2007 biographical drama films
American biographical drama films
Films about Elvis Presley
Films shot in Los Angeles
2007 drama films
2000s English-language films
2000s American films